Christine de Veyrac (born 6 November 1959 in Toulouse) is a French politician who served as a Member of the European Parliament from 1999 until 2014. She is a member of the Union for a Popular Movement, which is part of the European People's Party.

In parliament, De Veyrac served on the Committee on Transport and Tourism. She was also a substitute for the Committee on Civil Liberties, Justice and Home Affairs, a member of the delegation for relations with the Palestinian Legislative Council and a substitute for the delegation for relations with Israel.

She used to be the parliamentary attaché of Valéry Giscard d'Estaing.

Career
 Master's degree in international public law (Toulouse, 1983)
 National Secretary of the UMP (since 2003)
 Deputy Mayor of Toulouse with responsibility for international and European relations (since 2001)
 Member of the bureau of the Greater Toulouse Urban Area Community Council
 Secretary of the Town Planning and Aviation and Space Development Committee,
 Member of the European Parliament (from 1999)

External links

 European Parliament biography
 Declaration of financial interests (in French; PDF file)

1959 births
Living people
Toulouse 1 University Capitole alumni
MEPs for France 1999–2004
MEPs for South-West France 2004–2009
MEPs for South-West France 2009–2014
Union for a Popular Movement MEPs
20th-century women MEPs for France
21st-century women MEPs for France
Union of Democrats and Independents politicians